The Eli, formerly the Southern New England Telephone Company Administration Building, is a skyscraper at 227 Church Street in downtown New Haven, Connecticut.  Completed in 1938, it is the city's finest example of Art Deco architecture, and was headquarters to the Southern New England Telephone Company (SNET), which oversaw the building of the state's telephone networks.  Designed by Douglas Orr and Roy W. Foote, it was added to the National Register of Historic Places in 1997.

Description and history
The Eli is located at the junction of Church and Wall Streets in downtown New Haven, one block north of the New Haven Green in the city's commercial business district.  It has seventeen stories, and is built out of a steel frame whose exterior is clad mainly in Indiana granite.  A low pink granite wall delineates the property line on Church Street.  It rises as a rectangular monolith for thirteen floors, with the upper stories stepped back in stages.  The two street-facing facades have two-story entrance pavilions that project.  The Art Deco styling includes designs and depictions related to communications, including Classical style human figures wielding lightning bolts.  The interior lobby area, also two stories in height, continues these themes, and is richly finished in a variety of materials.

The former headquarters of the Southern New England Telephone Company (SNET), the Art Deco building was completed in 1938, and was the tallest building in the city until 1966 (it is currently the tenth-tallest building in New Haven's skyline). Some 1,200 SNET employees worked in the office building after its completion.  The company was one of New Haven's largest employers, and was responsible for the growth of the telephone system in the entire state. Beginning in 2004, the building was converted to a luxury apartment building and rechristened "The Eli"; it now is home to 142 apartments and two storefronts.

The building is regarded as New Haven's "premier" example of Art Deco architecture, and displays one of the area's most extensive employment of Stony Creek pink granite.

See also
National Register of Historic Places listings in New Haven, Connecticut

References

Office buildings completed in 1938
Skyscrapers in New Haven, Connecticut
Skyscraper office buildings in Connecticut
Art Deco skyscrapers
Commercial buildings on the National Register of Historic Places in Connecticut
Art Deco architecture in Connecticut
Telecommunications buildings on the National Register of Historic Places
National Register of Historic Places in New Haven, Connecticut
1938 establishments in Connecticut